This article provides details of international football games played by the Venezuela national football team from 2020 to present.

Results

2020

2021

2022

Forthcoming fixtures
The following match is scheduled:

Notes

References

External links

Venezuela national football team results
2020s in Venezuelan sport